The 2018 Men's Junior Continental Championship is the eleventh edition of the bi-annual tournament, played by eight countries from 25 August–2 September, 2018 in Havana, Cuba. The top finisher at the final standing will qualify to 2019 U-21 World Championship.

Pool composition

Pool standing procedure
Match won 3–0: 5 points for the winner, 0 point for the loser
Match won 3–1: 4 points for the winner, 1 points for the loser
Match won 3–2: 3 points for the winner, 2 points for the loser
In case of tie, the teams were classified according to the following criteria:
points ratio and sets ratio.

Preliminary round
Venue:  Coliseo de la Ciudad Deportiva, Havana, Cuba
All times are Cuba Daylight Time (UTC−04:00).

Pool A

Pool B

Final round

Quarterfinals

Classification 5–8

Semifinals

7th Place

5th Place

3rd Place

Final

Final standing

References

Men's NORCECA Volleyball Championship
NORCECA
2018 in Cuban sport
International volleyball competitions hosted by Cuba